Varkash or Varkesh may refer to:
 Varkash, Alborz
 Varkash, East Azerbaijan
 Varkesh, Hamadan